Digital Libraries are virtual spaces that mediate access, use and generation of knowledge.

The Corporation of Universities for the Development of Internet in Mexico promotes the development of digital libraries. The Open Network of Digital Libraries (ONeDL, or "RABiD" after its initials in Spanish) integrates and consolidates efforts of the corporation members to promote federated access to their collections and services. Software and standards will be produced in order to facilitate the inclusion of more Digital Libraries into ONeDL.

Initial collections include 

 Digital Theses
 Publications by ONeDL members
 Public academic papers
 Digitized Ancient Books Collections

Initial services include 

 Metasearch engines
 Virtual Reference environments
 Collection visualization
 Infrastructure for personal collections
 Collaborative recommendation

This network will take advantage of ongoing developments at each of its member institutions.

Members

Initial members of the network are 

 Benemérita Universidad Autónoma de Puebla (BUAP)
 Instituto Tecnologico y de Estudios Superiores de Monterrey (ITESM Campus Monterrey)
 Instituto de Investigaciones Dr. José María Luis Mora (MORA)
 Universidad Autónoma del Estado de México (UAEM)
 Universidad Autónoma de San Luis Potosí (UASLP)
 Universidad de Guadalajara (UDG)
 Universidad de las Américas Puebla (UDLA)
 Universidad Veracruzana (UV)
 Universidad Nacional Autónoma de México (UNAM)

This is an open network so new members will be added to this list.

New members 

 Texas A&M University Libraries

Through its Mexico City Center, the Libraries of Texas A&M University make their aerial scanning equipment available to all network members interested in digitizing ancient books and archives.
 Universidad de Sonora
 Universidad Autónoma del Estado de Hidalgo
 Universidad de Colima (UCOL)

Available documents 

Home Page ONeDL : Open Network of Digital Libraries

Software  

 VOAI OAI-PMH metadata server generator for relational databases
 XOAI OAI-PMH metadata server generator for xml databases
 xmLibris digitized documents administrator
 CIText digitized ancient books administrator
 [PDLib]  Personal Digital Library

Project communication:

 ONeDL Wiki, official community wiki
 ONeDL Bulletin Board for comments, questions and discussions from members and not members.

Mexican culture